Deputy assistant commissioner (DAC), formally Deputy Assistant Commissioner of Police of the Metropolis, is a rank in London's Metropolitan Police Service between assistant commissioner and commander. It is equivalent to deputy chief constable in other British police forces and wears the same insignia: a pip above crossed tipstaves within a wreath.

The rank was introduced in 1919 as an intermediate rank between assistant commissioner and (the Metropolitan Police rank of) chief constable. Deputy assistant commissioners were always warranted constables, as opposed to the higher ranks who were instead sworn as magistrates. In 1946 the rank was split, with senior DACs continuing to hold the rank and junior DACs (the four district commanders and the deputy to the assistant commissioner "C" in the Criminal Investigation Department) being regraded to the new rank of commander.

The rank was abolished on 1 April 1995 following recommendations made in the Sheehy Report, later confirmed by the Police Act 1996, although officers already holding the rank could continue to hold it. Senior commanders were in the meantime sometimes given the designation "deputy to assistant commissioner". The Home Office officially reintroduced the rank on 1 January 2002 under the terms of the Criminal Justice and Police Act 2001.

All the deputy assistant commissioners initially held senior staff jobs at Scotland Yard. In 1933, command of the four Districts, formerly held by chief constables, was given to deputy assistant commissioners, with the chief constables remaining as their deputies. District commanders were regraded to commander in 1946, but later regained DAC rank, holding it until 1995, by which time there were eight areas (as the districts had been renamed). These were reorganised into five and handed over to the assistant commissioners.

Footnotes

Ranks in the Metropolitan Police